The "Old Three Hundred" were 297 grantees who purchased 307 parcels of land from Stephen Fuller Austin in Mexican Texas. Each grantee was head of a household, or, in some cases,  a partnership of married men. Austin was an American approved in 1822 by Mexico as an empresario for this effort, after the nation had gained independence from Spain. By 1825 the colony had a population of 1,790, including 443 enslaved African Americans. Because the Americans believed they needed enslaved workers, Austin negotiated with the Mexican government to gain approval, as the new nation was opposed to slavery. Mexico abolished it in 1837.

The colony encompassed an area that ran from the Gulf of Mexico on the south, to near present-day Jones Creek in Brazoria County, Brenham in Washington County, Navasota in Grimes County, and La Grange in Fayette County. It was the first authorized colony of Anglo-American settlers and enslaved African Americans in Mexico.

Implementation
American Moses Austin was authorized as an empresario by Joaquín de Arredondo of Spain to create a colony of Americans in Texas, which was lightly populated, as a bulwark against the native Comanche people. Before this plan could be implemented, Moses Austin died in Missouri in 1821. That same year Mexico gained independence from Spain.

Stephen F. Austin agreed to carry out his father's plan for a colony. At the end of the summer of 1821, he and a small group of Anglo-American settlers crossed into Texas. Before he reached San Antonio to meet with the governor, the group learned that Mexico had gained its independence from Spain. Texas was now a Mexican province rather than a Spanish one. Governor Martinez assured Austin that the new Mexican government would honor the colonization contract.

Austin returned to Louisiana to recruit settlers. He offered land at 12 cents per acre, which was 10% of what comparable acreage sold for in the United States. The Settlers were required to satisfy four regulations:
They had to be Catholic, 
They had to be of good moral character, 
They had to improve the land (usually by adding structures), and 
They had to cultivate the land within two years, or forfeit it. 
Settlers would pay no customs duties for seven years and would not be subject to taxation for ten years.  In return, they were expected to become Mexican citizens.

In March 1822, Austin learned that the new Mexican government had not ratified his father's land grant from Spain. There, he discovered that the Mexican government was dedicated to equal rights for all races and opposed to slavery. (It abolished slavery in 1837.) Austin considered legal slavery critical to the success of his colony, so he spent a year in Mexico City lobbying against anti-slavery legislation. In 1823 he reached a compromise with the government of Agustín de Iturbide to allow slavery in Texas, with restrictions.

The 1823 Imperial Colonization Law of Mexico allowed an empresario to receive a land grant within the Mexican province of Texas.  The empresario and a commissioner appointed by the governor were authorized to distribute land to settlers and issue titles in the name of the Mexican government. Only one contract was ultimately approved under this legislation: the first contract granted to Stephen F. Austin.

Establishment
Between 1823 and 1825, Austin granted 297 titles under this contract. Each head of household received a minimum of 177 acres or 4,428 acres depending on whether they intended to farm or raise livestock.  The grant could be increased for large families or those wishing to establish a new industry, but the lands would be forfeited if they were not cultivated within two years.

The settlers who received their titles under Stephen's first contract, known today as the Old Three Hundred, made up the first organized, approved group of Anglo-American immigrants from the United States to Texas.  The new land titles were located in an area where no Spanish or Mexican settlements had existed. It covered land between the Brazos and the Colorado rivers, from the Gulf Coast to the San Antonio Road. This area had long been occupied by indigenous peoples, however, and they objected to Anglo-American encroachment, resisting with armed conflict. Both Comanche and Apache warriors raided the new colony.

Austin wrote the colony's legal code, including elements to control enslaved African Americans. Any slave who left a plantation without permission was to be tied up and whipped. Considerable fines were to be assessed for any person helping or harboring a runaway slave.

The capital of this new colony was San Felipe de Austin. This is now known as San Felipe in Austin County.

Growth
When Austin began advertising his colony, he received a great deal of interest. He was selective in his choice of colonists, which set it apart from others of the time. Austin chose settlers whom he believed would be based appropriately industrious. Overall, Austin chose people who belonged to a higher economic class than most immigrants, and all brought some property with them. All but four of the men could read and write. This relatively high level of literacy had a great influence on the future of the colony. According to historian William C. Davis, because the colonists were literate, they "absorbed and spread the knowledge and news always essential to uniting people to a common purpose".

Although Mexican law required immigrants to be Catholic, most of Austin's settlers were Protestant. Many chafed at being ruled by Catholics. Virtually all were of British ancestry.

One-quarter of the families brought enslaved African Americans with them. Jared Groce brought 90 slaves, having had large plantations in the Southeast. According to historian Christopher Long, the Old Three Hundred "constituted the heart of the burgeoning slave empire in antebellum Texas."

List
Lester G. Bugbee in his article "The Old Three Hundred", published in The Quarterly of the Texas State Historical Association (October 1897), identifies the head of each of the Old Three Hundred families who received a land grant in Austin's colony.  They were:

References

Bibliography
 
  originally published 2004 by New York: Free Press

External links
 
 A map of Austin Colony grants in Brazoria County, Texas <--Dead link, April 2016.

 
Mexican Texas
Populated places established in 1824